The 1978 Nebraska gubernatorial election was held on November 7, 1978, and featured U.S. Representative Charles Thone, a Republican, defeating Democratic nominee, Lieutenant Governor Gerald T. Whelan. Incumbent Governor J. James Exon, a Democrat, was barred from seeking a third term.

Democratic primary

Candidates
Robert V. Hansen
Gerald T. Whelan, Lieutenant Governor

Results

Republican primary

Candidates
Richard Hedrick
Stan Juelfs
Robert A. Phares, former Mayor of North Platte
Vance D. Rogers
Charles Thone, U.S. Representative

Results

General election

Results

References

Gubernatorial
1978
Nebraska